The Stampe et Vertongen RSV.22 was a training biplane produced in Belgium in the 1920s.

Design and development
The RSV.22 was a conventional, single-bay biplane with staggered wings of unequal span that were braced with N-struts near their tips. The fixed undercarriage consisted of two mainwheels that were joined by a common through axle, plus a tailskid. The student pilot and the instructor sat in open cockpits in tandem that were fitted with dual controls. Construction was of mixed materials, with metal used for the undercarriage, engine mount, and cabane struts. The control surfaces were operated by a rigid linkage made of dural tube. The horizontal stabilizer was adjustable in flight, using a lever in the cockpit to adjust the aircraft's trim. Incorrect use of this latter feature led to a number of accidents. The base model RSV 22/180 was powered by a 134-kW (180-hp) Hispano-Suiza engine, but the aircraft was designed to use powerplants of up to 220 kW (300 hp). The RSV 22/200 variant used a 150-kW (200-hp) Renard-built radial engine in place of the Hispano-Suiza.

The Belgian Air Force purchased 20 examples of the RSV 22/180. In 1928, Lt Edmond Thieffry and SLt Philippe Quersin piloted a civil-registered RSV 22/180 (registration O-BAJE) on an attempt at a long-distance flight to Africa. They departed Deurne on 26 June, attempting to reach Kinshasa. Resuming their journey, they were forced down a second time, this time in a marsh at Clapier, near Vauvert, still in France. They abandoned the attempt at this point and successfully returned to Belgium.

Variants
RSV.22/180 base model with  Hispano-Suiza engine (over 20 built)
RSV.22/200 version with  Renard Type 200 radial engine (1 built)
RSV.22 TitanA version powered by a  Gnome-Rhône 5K 5-cyl. radial engine.
RSV.22 LynxA version powered by a  Armstrong Siddeley Lynx 5-cyl. radial engine.

Operators

Belgian Air Force — 20 × RSV.22/180

Specifications (RSV.22/180)

See also

Notes

Bibliography

Further reading
 

1920s Belgian military trainer aircraft
Stampe et Vertongen aircraft
Biplanes
Single-engined tractor aircraft
Aircraft first flown in 1926